Antony Dupuis and Michaël Llodra were the defending champions, but Dupuis did not compete this year. Llodra partnered with Fabrice Santoro and lost in Quarterfinals to Gastón Etlis and Martín Rodríguez.

Etlis and Rodríguez won the title, defeating Rajeev Ram and Bobby Reynolds 6–4, 6–3 in the final.

Seeds

Draw

Draw

External links
 Main Draw

Pilot Pen Tennis
2005 Pilot Pen Tennis